Nylænde (Norwegian: New Frontiers) was a Norwegian political and cultural magazine that focused on women's rights. It was regarded as one of the most influential political magazines in Norway in its time and played an important role in the early Norwegian women's rights movement, and the struggle for women's suffrage. It was succeeded by the journal Kvinnesaksnytt in 1950.

History and profile
Nylænde was published by the Norwegian Association for Women's Rights from 1887. The magazine was published on a biweekly basis. Its first editor was Gina Krog, who edited the magazine from 1887 until her death in 1916. Fredrikke Mørck took over as editor from 1916. The magazine ended its publication in 1927.

References

External links

1887 establishments in Norway
1927 disestablishments in Norway
Biweekly magazines
Defunct magazines published in Norway
Defunct political magazines
Feminism in Norway
Feminist magazines
Magazines established in 1887
Magazines disestablished in 1927
Norwegian-language magazines
Women's magazines published in Norway
Political magazines published in Norway